"La grey zuliana" is a well-known Venezuelan gaita, and is regarded by some as the "Anthem of the Gaiteros"  (Venezuelan gaita musicians). It was composed by Ricardo Aguirre, and was first recorded in 1968 by its author with the group Saladillo. 

The lyrics to the song are as follows:

En todo tiempo cuando a la calle sales, mi reina, 

tu pueblo amado se ha confundido en un solo amor, 

amor inmenso, glorioso, excelso, sublime y tierno, 

amor celeste, divino y santo hacia tu bondad. 

Madre mía, si el gobierno 

no ayuda al pueblo zuliano, 

tendréis que meter la mano 

y mandarlo pa'l infierno. (Bis) 

[Chorus]:

La grey zuliana, cual rosario popular 

de rodillas va a implorar a su patrona, 

y una montaña de oraciones quiere dar 

esta gaita magistral que el saladillo la entona. (Bis) 

Tu pueblo te pide ahora 

madre mía, lo ayudéis 

y que fortuna le deis, 

con mucho amor te lo implora. (Bis)

Chorus

Acabaron con la plata 

y se echaron a reír, 

pero les puede salir 

el tiro por la culata. (Bis) 

Chorus

Maracaibo ha dando tanto 

que debiera de tener 

carreteras a granel 

con morocotas de canto. (Bis) 

Chorus

See also
Gaita zuliana
Music of Venezuela

References

Spanish-language songs
Venezuelan songs